The 11th Pan American Junior Athletics Championships were held at the Centro de Alto Rendimiento Deportivo Pedro Candioti in Santa Fe, Argentina, from October 18–20, 2001.

Participation (unofficial)

Detailed result lists can be found on the "World Junior Athletics History" website.  An unofficial count yields the number of about 296 athletes from about 25 countries:  Antigua and Barbuda (1), Argentina (40), Barbados (1), Bolivia (3), Brazil (44), Canada (48), Cayman Islands (1), Chile (14), Colombia (19), Costa Rica (1), Cuba (8), Dominican Republic (8), Ecuador (7), El Salvador (2), Guyana (2), Jamaica (19), Mexico (22), Panama (2), Paraguay (2), Peru (5), Suriname (2), Trinidad and Tobago (10), United States (15), Uruguay (5), Venezuela (15).

Medal summary
Medal winners are published.
Complete results can be found on the "World Junior Athletics History" website.

Men

Women

Medal table (unofficial)

References

External links
World Junior Athletics History

Pan American U20 Athletics Championships
2001 in Argentine sport
Pan American U20 Championships
International athletics competitions hosted by Argentina
2001 in youth sport